The One Roxas Triangle, also known as the One Roxas Triangle Tower 1 or Roxas Triangle Tower One, is a residential condominium skyscraper located in Makati, Philippines. It is owned by Roxas Land Corp., and was developed by the combined efforts of Ayala Land, Inc., Hongkong Land, Ltd. and Bank of the Philippine Islands. It stands at 174.3 metres (571.85 feet).

The Project Team
The One Roxas Triangle was designed by international architectural firm Skidmore, Owings & Merrill, LLP in cooperation with local architectural firm Pimentel Rodriguez Simbulan & Partners; while the structural design was provided by international engineering company Skilling Ward Magnusson Barkshire Inc. in cooperation with renowned local engineering firm Aromin & Sy + Associates. Construction management works were provided by TCGI Engineers, quantity surveying works by Davis, Langdon and Seah Philippines, and the general contractor is D.M. Consunji, Inc.

Members of the engineering and design team are Flack & Kurtz Consulting Engineers, LLP in cooperation with  DCCD Engineering Corp. (Mechanical and Electrical Works); N.B. Franco Consulting Engineers (Sanitary and Fire Protection Works); Belt Collins (HK) Ltd. (Landscape Architecture); Shen Milson & Wilke (Acoustic Design); Control Risks Pacific Pty. Ltd. (Security Services); and Paul Lau (Feng Shui consultancy).

Two Roxas Triangle 
 

Twenty years after the launch of One Roxas Triangle, Roxas Land Corp. launched the second tower called Two Roxas Triangle last 2013 to address the needs of uppermost luxury segment of market. The general contractor is Makati Development Corporation (Ayala Land construction arm) and it is slated to completion on 2019. The complex that both towers are part of is called Roxas Triangle Towers.

References

External links 
 
 One Roxas Triangle at Emporis
 One Roxas Triangle at Skyscraperpage
 Roxas Triangle Tower Project Page on SOM.com

Skyscrapers in Makati
Residential skyscrapers in Metro Manila
Makati Central Business District
Skidmore, Owings & Merrill buildings
Residential buildings completed in 2000